Mismatched Season 2 is the second season of the Indian Hindi-language coming-of-age romantic drama web series Mismatched, which originally premiered on Netflix in 2020. Season 2 is also directed by Akarsh Khurana and Nipun Dharmadhikari and produced by Ronnie Screwvala, featuring Prajakta Koli, Rohit Saraf, Vihaan Samat, Taaruk Raina, Muskkaan Jaferi, Devyani Shorey, Rannvijay Singh, and Vidya Malvade. It was released on 14 October 2022 with mixed reviews. but having maximum views on Netflix in terms of views per day .

Cast 

 Prajakta Koli as Dimple Ahuja, Simple and Dheeraj’s daughter; Celina’s ex best friend; Harsh’s project partner and former love interest; Rishi’s girlfriend.
 Rohit Saraf as Rishi Singh Shekhawat; Kalpana’s son, Randeep’s stepson; Sanskriti’s former love interest; Dimple’s boyfriend.
 Vihaan Samat as Harsh Agarwal, Dimple's project partner and formerly love interest
 Rannvijay Singha as Professor Siddharth Sinha (Sid)
 Vidya Malvade as Zeenat Karim, Sid's love interest
 Sanjana Sarathy as Sanskriti, Rishi's former  love interest
 Devyani Shorey as Namrata Bidasaria, Rishi's best friend
 Priya Banerjee as Ayesha Duggirala, Namrata's new love interest
 Taaruk Raina as Anmol Malhotra, Dimple's rival
 Muskkaan Jaferi as Celina Matthews, Dimple's ex bestfriend and Namrata's ex love interest
 Kritika Bharadwaj as Simran Malhotra, Anmol's cousin and Krish's ex-girlfriend
 Abhinav Sharma as Krish Katyal, Anmol's bestfriend and Simran's ex-boyfriend
 Ruturaj Shinde as Momo
 Lisha Bajaj as Hostel Warden
 Akarsh Khurana as Anmol's therapist
 Ahsaas Channa as Vinny, Anmol's new friend
 Dipannita Sharma as Nandini Nahata, Sid's ex-girlfriend and Dimple's career idol
 Ravin Makhija as Ashish Singh Shekhawat, Rishi's brother
 Suhasini Mulay as Rishi's Grandmother
 Aditi Govitrikar as Kalpana, Rishi's mother
 Jugal Hansraj as Rishi's father
 Kshitee Jog as Simple Ahuja, Dimple's mother
 Jatin Sial as Dheeraj Ahuja, Dimple's father
 Adhir Bhat as Mr. Bidasaria, Namrata's father
 Sarika Singh as Mrs. Bidasaria, Namrata's mother
 Digvijay Savant as Randeep, Rishi's stepfather
 Shaunak Ramesh as Ramaswamy
 Trishna Singh as Shahana
 Vaibhav Palhade as Samar
 Yash Buddhdev as Danish Tamang
 Chirag Pardesi as Ritik

Episodes

Production

Soundtrack 

The soundtrack album for Mismatched S2 was composed by an assortment of ten artists, which includes Jasleen Royal, Samar Grewal, Anurag Saikia, Nikhita Gandhi, Shashwat Singh, Imaaduddin Shah, Shwetang Shankar, Ritviz Srivastava, Tkdvaibhavjha and Jackey Mishra.

Reviews 
Shubham Kulkarni of Koimoi gave the series, a rating of 2.5 out of 5 and stated "I understand the audience of the show doesn’t watch it as critically, and the makers have catered to them. But that doesn’t mean nobody assesses a show that has the potential to be good. With a whole lot of flaws, Mismatched season 2 manages to not sink but the future deserves more to sail."

Ronak Kotecha of the Times of India gave three out of five and said "The overall treatment of this season too remains quite breezy and superficial with issues that are relatable for the youth while some seem like clichéd stereotypical situations that have been exploited far too many times before." NDTV gave 3.6 out of 5 to the series. Poulomi Das of Firstpost  gave 2 out of 5 and said "Rohit Saraf and Prajakta Koli’s Netflix rom-com series continues to be a wasted opportunity."

References 

Television shows based on Indian novels
Hindi-language web series
Indian comedy web series
Hindi-language Netflix original programming